Lincoln Fields may refer to:

 Lincoln Fields Race Track
 Lincoln Fields Shopping Centre
 Lincoln Fields Station
 Lincoln Heights, Ottawa